The 2021 Italian motorcycle Grand Prix (officially known as the Gran Premio d'Italia Oakley) was the sixth round of the 2021 Grand Prix motorcycle racing season. It was held at the Autodromo Internazionale del Mugello in Scarperia e San Piero on 30 May 2021. At this race, Sky VR46 using the Italian tricolour special livery Mugello. 

The weekend was marred by the death of Jason Dupasquier. Dupasquier collided with Ayumu Sasaki during Moto3 qualifying, with him then being hit by Jeremy Alcoba. Alcoba and Sasaki were unhurt, but Dupasquier was critically wounded, before being airlifted to Careggi Hospital in Florence. Dupasquier died at the hospital due to his injuries a day after the accident.

Qualifying

MotoGP

Race

MotoGP

Moto2

Thomas Lüthi withdrew from the race on Sunday morning following the fatal accident of compatriot and Moto3 rider Jason Dupasquier.

Moto3

Ryusei Yamanaka withdrew from the race on Sunday morning following the fatal accident of his teammate Jason Dupasquier.

Championship standings after the race
Below are the standings for the top five riders, constructors, and teams after the round.

MotoGP

Riders' Championship standings

Constructors' Championship standings

Teams' Championship standings

Moto2

Riders' Championship standings

Constructors' Championship standings

Teams' Championship standings

Moto3

Riders' Championship standings

Constructors' Championship standings

Teams' Championship standings

Notes

References

External links

Italian
Motorcycle Grand Prix
Motorcycle Grand Prix
Italian motorcycle Grand Prix
Motorcycle racing controversies